Smarts Quarry is a Site of Special Scientific Interest (SSSI) in Carmarthenshire, Wales, designated in 1987 for its geological features.

SSSI

The SSSI citation for Smart Quarry specifies the importance of "abundant, bivalve produced, stellate feeding traces on a bedding surface" within the Namurian quartzite of the quarry. The citation finds such traces unique within the Namurian basal grits of South Wales and suggestive of an estuarine rather than a shoreline sedimentary deposition of the quarry stone.

See also
List of Sites of Special Scientific Interest in Carmarthenshire

References

External links
SSSI information from Natural Resources Wales:
SSSI Citation
Your Special Site and its Future
Maps: 
SSSI Citation map
MAGIC map - DEFRA
NBN Gateway map - National Biodiversity Network

Quarries in Wales
Sites of Special Scientific Interest in Carmarthen & Dinefwr